Sarah Doan La Fetra (June 11, 1843 - May 7, 1919) was an American temperance worker.

Biography
Sarah Doan was born in Sabina, Ohio, on June 11, 1843, the fourth daughter of the Rev. Timothy Doan (1814–1891) and Mary Ann Custis (1811–1898). Her mother was a member of the famous Virginia Custis family, and her father was a Methodist minister.

She prepared herself for teaching in the normal school of Professor Holbrook in Lebanon, Ohio. Doan taught in the public schools of Fayette County, Ohio.

In 1867 she married George H. La Fetra (1840–1926), of Warren County, who served three years in the Union army in the 39th Ohio Volunteers, and after accepted a position under his cousin, Hon. James Harlan, then Secretary of the Interior. The La Fetras had three sons, the youngest of whom died in infancy. The elder, Dr. Linnaeus E. La Fetra, graduated from Wesleyan University, of Middletown, Connecticut, and from the College of Physicians and Surgeons of New York City, first honors of his class. He became a physician in one of the largest hospitals of New York City. The other surviving son was Edwin Snow La Fetra (1872–1956), graduated from Princeton College.

In 1876 she became member of the Woman's Christian Temperance Union and in 1885 Sarah La Fetra was elected President of the Woman's Christian Temperance Union, District of Columbia. Under her leadership the District Union grew into a felt power. She was also for years the President of the Ladies' Aid Society of the Metropolitan M. E. Church, of Washington, and the President of the Woman's Foreign Missionary Society of that church. She was the President of the District of Columbia Branch of the Society of Loyal Women of American Liberty, and the Third National Vice-President of this Society. She was one of the founders of the Florence Crittendon Hope and Help Mission in Washington. The Baltimore branch of the Woman's Foreign Society erected a building at Bidar, India, called "The Sarah D. La Fetra Memorial", in recognition of her effective labors in that society.

She was a practical business woman, and for years fought the rum traffic in a sure and substantial way, by successfully managing a temperance hotel and cafe, The Temple Café, at 604 Ninth Street N.W., in the very heart of the city of Washington. Temple Café, on the ground floor of the Masonic Temple, catered specifically to important women leaders who visited Washington. In 1882, Judith Ellen Foster, attorney from Iowa, stayed at the Temple Cafe. In 1894 La Fetra took over the former Irvine Hotel on the northwest corner of Eleventh and G Street N.W. and renamed it Hotel La Fetra. The national Woman's Christian Temperance Union met there in 1906 and were treated to an elegant vegetarian dinner, La Fetra having becoming a vegetarian at some point.

She was a suffragist, although not identified with the organization.

She died on May 7, 1919, at her apartment at 3152 Mount Pleasant Street NW, and is buried at Arlington National Cemetery.

References

1843 births
1919 deaths
Woman's Christian Temperance Union people
Methodists from Ohio
American temperance activists
People from Sabina, Ohio
Wikipedia articles incorporating text from A Woman of the Century
Burials at Arlington National Cemetery